Tribunals in India are quasi judicial bodies for settling various administrative and tax-related disputes, including Central Administrative Tribunal (CAT), Income Tax Appellate Tribunal (ITAT), Customs, Excise and Service Tax Appellate Tribunal (CESTAT), National Green Tribunal (NGT), Competition Appellate Tribunal (COMPAT) and Securities Appellate Tribunal (SAT), among others.

In several states, Food Safety Appellate Tribunals  have been created to hear appeals against orders of adjudicating officers for food safety (additional deputy commissioners).

Armed Forces Tribunal (AFT) is a military tribunal in India. It was established under the Armed Forces Tribunal Act, 2007.

The National Company Law Tribunal is a quasi-judicial body in India that adjudicates issues relating to Indian companies. 

National Company Law Appellate Tribunal (NCLAT) was constituted under Section 410 of the Companies Act, 2013 for hearing appeals against the orders of National Company Law Tribunal(s) (NCLT), with effect from 1st June, 2016.

There are 14 Tribunals in India.

Tribunals in India

Following are the tribunals in India.

Replaced and Dissolved Tribunals 

Following is the list of tribunals dissolved and its replacements:

Composition

The tribunals will consist of Chairman, vice-chairman and others whose terms of office will be restricted to five years and they will be eligible for reappointment after retirement.

References

Indian Tribunals